is a classical trans-Neptunian object and member of Haumea family from the Kuiper belt located in the outermost regions of the Solar System, approximately 300 kilometers in diameter. It was first observed on 23 September 2003, by astronomers of the Canada–France Ecliptic Plane Survey at Mauna Kea Observatories on Hawaii.

Physical properties 

 is a classical Kuiper belt object (cubewano) belonging to the hot population. Its size estimated to lie between 150 and 450 km based on a range of plausible albedos. The object has a large light curve amplitude of about 0.85, which indicates that it has an extremely elongated shape or is a contact binary. If  is a contact binary, which is actually more likely, the density is estimated at about 2.67 g/cm3. In the latter case, the components are also thought to be unequal in size with the mass ratio of about 0.3 and axis ratios of about 0.8 and 0.5, respectively, for the primary and secondary components.

Origin 

 was identified as a member of the Haumea family, which is defined based on a common pattern of IR water-ice absorption, neutral visible spectrum and the clustering of the orbital elements.

See also

References

External links 
 

612620
612620
20030823
612620